The Cashmere Valley Record is a newspaper founded in 1907 that covers local news, sports, and obituaries surrounding the Cashmere, Washington region. It also covers news for Peshastin, Dryden, and Monitor.

It was sold in the late 1990s and shares an owner with the Leavenworth Echo.

There is an edition released once a week on Wednesdays, and the publications are owned by NCW Media, Inc. who also own and publish five other weekly newspapers that serve as a sightseeing resource for visitors. The paper is managed and edited by Gary Begin.

References 

Newspapers published in Washington (state)
Chelan County, Washington